KQXT-FM (101.9 MHz, "Q101.9") is a commercial radio station in San Antonio, Texas. The station is owned by iHeartMedia, airing an adult contemporary radio format, switching to Christmas music for much of November and December.  On weekdays, it carries the syndicated Kidd Kradick Morning Show from co-owned KHKS Dallas as well as Ellen K on Saturday mornings.  KQXT's studios are in Stone Oak. 

KQXT has an effective radiated power (ERP) of 100,000 watts, the current maximum for FM stations.  It transmits from an antenna atop the Tower of the Americas in Downtown San Antonio.

History
Its original call sign was KCOR-FM, the sister station to KCOR 1350 AM (now KXTN). It shared an antenna with the AM station on Abe Lincoln Road in northwest San Antonio. KCOR was an established Regional Mexican station, going back to 1946. The FM was always separately programmed from the AM, and in 1971, switched its call sign to KQXT. The call letters are an approximation of the word "Quiet" with the station playing beautiful music.

KCOR and KQXT were sold in 1975 to Harbenito Radio (later known as Tichenor Media). The FM's transmitter moved from Abe Lincoln Road to the Tower of the Americas site in downtown San Antonio in 1972.  Then in 1984, KCOR-FM was sold to Westinghouse's Group W Broadcasting which had easy listening music on most of its FM stations.  But by the late 1980s, the easy sound was attracting older listeners while most advertisers seek a young to middle-aged demographic.

In 1990, KQXT moved away from its longtime easy listening image to an updated, all-vocal, soft adult contemporary playlist.  It began using the slogan, "Continuous Soft Favorites" and was re-branded as "KQ-102". The station achieved great success in the early 1990s, and, at one point was the top adult station in San Antonio. It was acquired by Clear Channel Communications in 1993, a company that already owned WOAI and several other local stations.

In 2000, KQXT was re-branded as "Soft Rock 101.9" in an effort to move to a more upbeat playlist.  On January 2, 2007, the station rebranded as "Q101.9". The format was similar but some rhythmic adult songs were added.  In 2014, parent company Clear Channel Communications changed its name to iHeartMedia.

The syndicated call-in and request show Delilah was previously heard on KQXT until 2011, when the station dropped her show. On July 3, 2017, KQXT brought her back. Delilah was dropped again in August 2018.  It is syndicated by co-owned Premiere Networks.  On November 9, 2020, KQXT added the nationally syndicated Kidd Kraddick Morning Show in AM drive time.

K289BN/KQXT-HD3
In May 2012, KQXT-HD3 was activated and began simulcasting talk radio sister station WOAI 1200 AM, which fed FM translator K289BN at 105.7 MHz.

On September 19, 2012, K289BN began simulcasting KRPT, and changed to a Rhythmic contemporary sound, branded as "Wild 92.5/105.7".

On February 22, 2013, KRPT changed to Classic Country. K289BN kept the rhythmic CHR format and "WiLD" brand until the station changed to Regional Mexican, branded as "La Preciosa" on January 17, 2014.

References

External links
KQXT-FM Website
WILD 105.7 Website

QXT-FM
Radio stations established in 1967
IHeartMedia radio stations